Jack the Giant Slayer (previously titled Jack the Giant Killer) is a 2013 American fantasy adventure film directed by Bryan Singer and written by Darren Lemke, Christopher McQuarrie and Dan Studney, from a story by Lemke and David Dobkin. The film, based on the British fairy tales "Jack the Giant Killer" and "Jack and the Beanstalk", stars Nicholas Hoult, Eleanor Tomlinson, Stanley Tucci, Ian McShane, Bill Nighy, and Ewan McGregor. The film tells the story of Jack, a young farmhand who must rescue a princess from a race of giants after inadvertently opening a gateway to their land in the sky.

Development of Jack the Giant Slayer began in 2005, when Lemke first pitched the idea. D. J. Caruso was hired to direct the film in January 2009, but in September of that year, Caruso was replaced by Singer, who hired McQuarrie and Studney to rework the script. The main characters were cast between February and March 2011, and principal photography began in April 2011 in England with locations in Somerset, Gloucestershire and Norfolk. Release of the film was moved back in post-production to allow more time for special effects and marketing.

Jack the Giant Slayer premiered on February 26, 2013, in Hollywood. It was released theatrically in the United States on March 1, 2013, receiving mixed reviews from critics and was a box office flop.

Plot

In the Kingdom of Cloister, farm boy Jack is fascinated by the legend of Erik, an ancient king who defeated an army of invading giants from a realm in the sky controlling them with a magical crown. Simultaneously, Princess Isabelle is fascinated with the same legend.

Ten years later, Jack sells a horse in town for his uncle. There, Jack defends Isabelle's honor from a group of hooligans, becoming enamored with her. Meanwhile, Lord Roderick discovers a monk has robbed him of magic beans, who offers them to Jack as collateral for his horse. 

Back at the castle, Isabelle quarrels with her father King Brahmwell as she wants to explore the kingdom, but he wants her to stay and marry Roderick. Likewise, Jack's uncle scolds him for being foolish before throwing the beans to the floor and leaving.

Determined to be free, Isabelle sneaks out of the castle, seeking shelter from the rain at Jack's. As it rains, one of the beans takes root and grows into a massive beanstalk that carries the house and Isabelle into the sky as Jack falls to the ground.

Jack, Roderick, and Roderick's attendant Wicke join the king's knights, led by Elmont and his second-in-command, Crawe, climbing the beanstalk in search of Isabelle. As they climb, a lightning storm during the night knocks five knights from the beanstalk, and Roderick and Wicke cut the safety rope, intentionally sending them to their deaths - the two claim the rope snapped. 

At the top, they discover the giants' realm and split into two groups: one with Jack, Elmont, and Crawe, and the other including Roderick, Wicke, and a knight. Before Roderick secretly takes the remaining beans from Jack, threatening death if he tells anybody about it (although Jack manages to save one).

Jack's group is trapped by a giant, who takes Elmont and Crawe prisoner while Jack, his scent hidden being underwater, escapes. Meanwhile, Roderick tricks the knight close to the ledge and pushes him to his death, but then immediately encounters two other giants; one eats Wicke, but Roderick dons the magical crown before meeting the same fate.

Jack follows the giant to their stronghold, where the two-headed giant leader, Fallon, devours Crawe and he finds Isabelle and Elmont imprisoned. As the giants prepare to kill the prisoners, Roderick walks in and enslaves them with the crown. He tells the giants they will attack Cloister at dawn, and gives them permission to eat Isabelle and Elmont. 

One of the giants prepares to cook Elmont as a pig-in-a-blanket and is about to chop Isabelle up when Jack impales his neck with a kitchen knife from above. The trio races to the beanstalk, where Jack causes the giant guarding it to fall off the realm's edge. Seeing the giant's body, Brahmwell orders the beanstalk cut down to avoid a giant invasion, putting the safety of the Earth ahead of Isabelle's possible return.

Jack and Isabelle head down the beanstalk, during which they admit their growing feelings, while Elmont stays to confront Roderick. He kills him, but Fallon takes the crown before he can, so he is forced to escape down the falling beanstalk or be trapped in the giants' realm. Jack, Isabelle, and Elmont all survive the fall after the beanstalk is cut down. As everyone returns home, Jack warns them the giants used Roderick's beans to create beanstalks to descend down to attack Cloister.

The giants chase Jack, Isabelle, and Brahmwell into the castle, where Elmont fills the moat with oil and lights it. Fallon falls into the moat and breaks into the throne room from below. As the siege continues and both sides struggle for control of the drawbridge, Fallon captures Jack and Isabelle, but Jack throws the final bean down Fallon's throat before he can eat him, causing a beanstalk to rip apart his body. Jack takes the crown just as the giants break into the courtyard, he takes control of them, sending them back to their realm to cut down the beanstalks themselves.

Brahmwell abolishes the law that the princess can't be with a commoner, so Jack and Isabelle marry and tell the story of the giants to their children. As time passes, the magic crown is crafted into St Edward's Crown and is secured in the Tower of London while the giants' realm is shown to still exist above London in the modern day.

Cast

Production

Development
Screenwriter Darren Lemke first proposed the idea of contemporizing the "Jack and the Beanstalk" fairy tale with CGI in 2005 before the release of other contemporary films based on fairy tales such as Alice in Wonderland (2010), Red Riding Hood (2011) and Snow White and the Huntsman (2012). Lemke described the script as "a male-oriented story of a boy becoming a man" and drew a parallel between Jack and Luke Skywalker of Star Wars. In January 2009, New Line Cinema hired D. J. Caruso to direct the script, which was subsequently rewritten by Mark Bomback. By August 2009, it was reported that Bryan Singer might be replacing Caruso; this became official in September 2009.

In April 2010, Singer re-teamed with screenwriter Christopher McQuarrie to rework the screenplay. Singer and McQuarrie had previously collaborated on Public Access, The Usual Suspects, Apt Pupil, and Valkyrie. Singer stated, "Chris McQuarrie did a significant re-write for me. He brought a different structure. It was very much a page-one situation; a different storyline. It involved the same characters, but some we juggled around and switched around. He just brought a very different perspective". McQuarrie's re-write included a deeper back story for the giants and explanation of their relationship with the humans, which Singer considered a "vast improvement"; it also upped the budget. To get the budget back in line, Singer brought in television writer Dan Studney to work on the project.

In May 2010, ReelzChannel reported that production of the film would be delayed until February 2011. The report cited Singer's interest in being able to pre-visualize scenes with the digital giants in-camera with the live-action actors (a la James Cameron's Avatar) and the need for more time to work out the complex process as reasons for the delay.

Pre-production
In October 2010, New Line gave Bryan Singer the green-light to begin pre-production work on Jack the Giant Killer, with production scheduled to begin the following spring. In November 2010, Singer began screen-testing for the male and female leads. Aaron Johnson, Nicholas Hoult, and Aneurin Barnard were considered for the role of the young farmhand, and Adelaide Kane, Lily Collins, and Juno Temple tested for the princess role.

In December 2010, Singer said, "I'm very much looking forward to using the EPIC Red for my next movie Jack the Giant Killer which will be shot in, what else, 3D. The camera's incredibly compact size and extraordinary resolution are ideal for the 3D format. But more importantly Jack the Giant Killer is my first movie set in a time before electricity. The EPIC's extraordinary exposure latitude will allow me to more effectively explore the use of natural light".

In February 2011, The Hollywood Reporter reported that Stanley Tucci had been cast as the antagonist, the king's advisor who plans on taking over the kingdom, and Bill Nighy and John Kassir were cast as Fallon, the two-headed leader of the giants; Nighy would play the big head and Kassir would play the smaller head. Also in February, Nicholas Hoult was offered the lead role. Singer said he had liked him since Skins and was very supportive of his casting in X-Men: First Class. Later that month, Ewan McGregor joined the cast as the leader of the king's elite guard, who helps fight giants.

In March 2011, Eleanor Tomlinson was cast opposite Nicholas Hoult as the princess and Ian McShane was cast to play her father, King Brahmwell. Two days later, New Line and Warner Bros. announced a release date of June 15, 2012.

Filming
Principal photography began on April 12, 2011, in the British countryside. In May 2011, production moved to Somerset, England for two weeks with filming scheduled in Wells, Cheddar and secret locations in the county including scenes filmed at Wells Cathedral. Also in May, scenes were shot at Puzzlewood in the Forest of Dean near Coleford, Gloucestershire. Puzzlewood, which features unusual tree and rock formations, has previously been used for filming of the BBC TV series Doctor Who and Merlin. The same forest is said to have inspired J. R. R. Tolkien to write The Hobbit. Later that month, filming took place at Norwich Cathedral in Norwich, Norfolk.

About the performance-capture process Singer stated, "It's fascinating ... It takes you back to play-acting as a kid in your living room because you are running around and having to imagine that you are in Gantua and imagine that there are these weapons and all these giant things. But there's nothing when you are there other than styrofoam and blocks. It forces the actors to regress to when they would play-act as kids or do minimalist theatre. But in that way it's fascinating - I can see why Robert Zemeckis and James Cameron have started to shoot pictures this way".

Post-production

In January 2012, Warner Bros. moved back the release date by nine months, from June 15, 2012, to March 22, 2013. The Hollywood Reporter stated: "Warner can likely afford the move because of Christopher Nolan's The Dark Knight Rises, which opened in July. And moving the film back gives the studio more time for special effects, as well as a chance to attach trailers for it to Peter Jackson's Christmas tentpole The Hobbit: An Unexpected Journey". In October 2012, Warner Bros. again moved the release date, this time to March 1, 2013, three weeks earlier than the previous date. Warner Bros also changed the title of the film from Jack the Giant Killer to Jack the Giant Slayer.

The film's special effects were completed by seven different visual effects houses: Digital Domain, Giant Studios, The Third Floor, MPC, Soho VFX, Rodeo FX and Hatch Productions. Creating the giants took four main steps. The first step was Pre-Capture, in which performance capture was used to capture the actor's facial and body movements and render them in a real-time virtual environment. The second step took place during principal photography, where Simulcam technology was used to help the human characters virtually interact with the giants that were rendered earlier in Pre-Capture. The third step was Post-Capture, a second performance capture shoot to adjust giants' movements to seamlessly fit the live-action performances. The final step involved putting the finishing touches on the giant's animation, skin, hair and clothing, and composition in the shots. Creating the beanstalk involved two main requirements: set extension for shots of the actors interacting with the beanstalk, which were shot against a bluescreen, and complete CG renderings for shots of the beanstalk growing and extending from Earth into the world of the giants.

Singer stated that he had to tone down the special effects to keep the film age-appropriate for children. He said, "This movie probably has a bigger on-screen body count than any movie I've done before. It's done in a way that's fun, but it was a challenge to get away with that without it becoming upsetting to people ... It was about creating a tone like Raiders of the Lost Ark or Star Wars that allows you to get away with a lot of stuff because it feels like a movie."

Soundtrack

The film's soundtrack features music by John Ottman, who also served as an editor and associate producer on the film. Jack the Giant Slayer marks Ottman's seventh collaboration with director Bryan Singer; they previously worked together on Public Access, The Usual Suspects, Apt Pupil, X2: X-Men United, Superman Returns, and Valkyrie. The soundtrack album was released on February 26, 2013, by WaterTower Music.

Release
Jack the Giant Slayer premiered on Tuesday, February 26, 2013, at TCL Chinese Theatre in Hollywood, California.

Reception

Box office
Pre-release tracking showed that Jack the Giant Slayer was projected to gross $30 million to $35 million in its opening weekend, a disappointing figure considering it cost at least $185 million to produce. The film grossed $400,000 from Thursday night and midnight runs, ahead of its wide release open on Friday, March 1, 2013. Through the weekend, the film grossed $28.01 million in North America at 3,525 locations, taking first place at the box office. The audience was 55% male and 56% were over the age of 25, despite the studio's efforts to target families. At the same time, the film took in an additional $13.7 million in 10 Asian markets at 1,824 locations.

Four weeks into its theatrical run, The Hollywood Reporter reported that the film was on track to lose between $125 million and $140 million for Legendary Pictures, suggesting that the film would likely close at $200 million worldwide, short of its combined production and marketing budget. Jack the Giant Slayer closed in theaters on June 13, 2013, grossing a total of $65,187,603 in North America and $197,687,603 worldwide. In explaining its box office failure, analysts pointed to the conflict between the director's darker, more adult-themed vision with the studio's desire for a family-friendly product, leading to the final compromise of a PG-13 film that did not sufficiently appeal to adults or children.

Critical reception

Jack the Giant Slayer received a mixed response from film critics. On the review aggregation website Rotten Tomatoes the film has a rating of 52%, based on 208 reviews, with an average rating of 5.70/10. The site's critical consensus reads, "It's enthusiastically acted and reasonably fun, but Jack the Giant Slayer is also overwhelmed by digital effects and a bland, impersonal story." On Metacritic, it has a weighted average score of 51 out of 100, based on 37 critics, indicating "mixed or average reviews". Audiences surveyed by CinemaScore gave the film a grade "B+" on scale of A to F.

Todd McCarthy of The Hollywood Reporter said, "Simply in terms of efficient storytelling, clear logistics and consistent viewer engagement, Jack is markedly superior to the recent Hobbit." Richard Roeper of the Chicago Sun-Times said, "Jack the Giant Slayer is a rousing, original and thoroughly entertaining adventure."

Justin Chang of Variety said, "Jack the Giant Slayer feels, unsurprisingly, like an attempt to cash in on a trend, recycling storybook characters, situations and battle sequences to mechanical and wearyingly predictable effect." Manohla Dargis of The New York Times said, "This finally is just a digitally souped-up, one-dimensional take on 'Jack and the Beanstalk'." Kenneth Turan of the Los Angeles Times said, "Bryan Singer's take on the old fairy tale has all things money can buy — except a good script."

Accolades

Home media
In April 2013, Warner Bros. Home Entertainment announced the release of Jack the Giant Slayer on Blu-ray 3D, Blu-ray Disc and DVD. The discs were released on June 18, 2013, in two editions; a three-disc 3D/Blu-ray/DVD combo pack, and a two-disc Blu-ray/DVD combo pack. Both sets include the "Become a Giant Slayer" featurette, deleted scenes, a gag reel and a digital copy of the film.

References

External links

 
 
 
 

2013 films
2013 3D films
2010s fantasy adventure films
2010s monster movies
American 3D films
American fantasy adventure films
Films scored by John Ottman
Films based on Jack and the Beanstalk
Films based on multiple works
Films directed by Bryan Singer
Films produced by Neal H. Moritz
Films set in Europe
Films set in London
Films set in the Middle Ages
Films set in 2013
Films shot in England
Films shot in Gloucestershire
Films shot in Norfolk
Films shot in Somerset
Giant monster films
IMAX films
Jack the Giant Killer
Legendary Pictures films
New Line Cinema films
Original Film films
Warner Bros. films
Films using motion capture
Films with screenplays by Christopher McQuarrie
American sword and sorcery films
Bad Hat Harry Productions films
Films produced by Bryan Singer
Films with screenplays by Darren Lemke
Films shot at Elstree Film Studios
2010s English-language films
2010s American films